Abdeslem Dargouth (born 4 November 1935) is a Tunisian middle-distance runner. He competed in the men's 800 metres at the 1960 Summer Olympics.

References

External links
 

1935 births
Living people
Athletes (track and field) at the 1960 Summer Olympics
Tunisian male middle-distance runners
Olympic athletes of Tunisia
Place of birth missing (living people)
20th-century Tunisian people